Sofian Kiyine (born 2 October 1997) is a professional footballer who plays as a midfielder for Belgian First Division A club OH Leuven. Born in Belgium, he has represented the Morocco U20 and Morocco U23 national teams at international level.

Club career
Kiyine made his professional debut in the Serie A for Chievo on 8 January 2017 in a game against Atalanta.

On 17 July 2019, he signed for Lazio and on the same day was sent on loan to Salernitana for the 2019–20 season. On 28 January 2021, he returned to Salernitana on another loan. On 30 August 2021, he signed on loan for Venezia, after that season Lazio sold him to OH Leuven where he signed a four-year deal until 2026.

International career
Kiyine represented the Morocco U20 national team at the 2017 Jeux de la Francophonie, scoring the side's only goal in the final wherein they won the competition.

He is also eligible to represent Belgium and Italy, the latter because of his mother.

Career statistics

Honours
Morocco
 Jeux de la Francophonie gold medalist: 2017

References

External links
 

Living people
1997 births
People from Verviers
Moroccan footballers
Belgian footballers
Association football midfielders
Morocco youth international footballers
Moroccan people of Italian descent
Belgian sportspeople of Moroccan descent
Belgian people of Italian descent
A.C. ChievoVerona players
U.S. Salernitana 1919 players
S.S. Lazio players
Venezia F.C. players
Oud-Heverlee Leuven players
Serie A players
Serie B players
Moroccan expatriate footballers
Belgian expatriate footballers
Moroccan expatriate sportspeople in Italy
Belgian expatriate sportspeople in Italy
Expatriate footballers in Italy
Footballers from Liège Province